Disney's Aladdin is a 1994 video game developed by SIMS Co., Ltd. for the Game Gear and Master System. Based on the film of the same name, Disney's Aladdin is a side-scrolling platform game in which the player character is Aladdin.

The Genesis game differs markedly from the 8-bit game on the Game Gear and Master System.

Development
The Walt Disney Company gave Sega a license to create Aladdin games for both the Game Gear and the Sega Genesis because of Sega's previous successes with other Disney video games, such as Castle of Illusion Starring Mickey Mouse and QuackShot.

Reception

In the United States, it topped the Game Gear sales charts for three months in 1994, from June to August 1994. In the United Kingdom, it was the top-selling Game Gear game in April 1994.

GamePro named Disney's Aladdin the best Game Gear game at the 1994 Consumer Electronics Show, remarking, "Gorgeous background graphics and detailed, quick-moving sprites make this a magical adventure, indeed." Their subsequent review of the game was more critical. Though they maintained that the graphics are exceptionally good, they criticized the controls and the beginner-level challenge, commenting, "It would have been better to spend less money on the animated sequences and more on putting better game play into the cart." Four reviewers from Electronic Gaming Monthly wrote reviews of the game, with Ed Semrad giving the game a 9/10 rating and the other three (Danyon Carpenter, Al Manuel, Sushi-X) giving it a 7/10 rating.

Legacy
In 2013, Complex listed the game as one of the 25 best handheld video games made, arguing that it combines elements of two other Disney's Aladdin video games: the Super Nintendo Entertainment System game and the Genesis game.

References

External links

Aladdin (franchise) video games
Side-scrolling platform games
Master System games
1994 video games
SIMS Co., Ltd. games
Sega video games
Game Gear games
Single-player video games
Video games set in the Middle East
Video games developed in Japan